Leopold "Grundl" Grundwald (28 October 1891 – April 1969) was an Austrian footballer and coach. He competed at the 1912 Summer Olympics.

References

External links
 
 Rapid Archiv

1891 births
1969 deaths
Austrian footballers
Austria international footballers
Olympic footballers of Austria
Footballers at the 1912 Summer Olympics
Association football forwards
SK Rapid Wien players
Austrian football managers
FC St. Gallen managers
FC Schaffhausen managers